Number Seven is the seventh studio album by American musician Phideaux Xavier. It is a concept album based on its main character; a dormouse. Inside, it features 20 pages of artwork featuring the dormouse and other characters.

The album's first and last song are "Dormouse - A Theme" and "Dormouse - An End" (reminiscent on King Crimson's In the Wake of Poseidon). It is divided in three acts.

Musical styles
The album is played by the live band, with no outside musicians or orchestra. Its musical style is closer to the albums Chupacabras and Doomsday Afternoon. It is a blend of progressive rock and psychedelic rock with chamber jazz and classical music.

Remastered edition
A remastered version of the album was released in April 2010. Phideaux later said about the original release of Number Seven: "[...], we made a mistake with the first issue of Number Seven by breaking up the songs into smaller sub-bits for people to have easy access to. People couldn't really find the 'songs' of Number Seven." The remastered version of the album fused many of the original version's short tracks into longer tracks.

Track listing

Remastered edition

Personnel
Phideaux Xavier - Acoustic Guitar, electric twelve-string Guitar, Piano & Vocals
Ariel Farber - Violin & Vocals
Rich Hutchins - Drums & Chant
Mathew Kennedy - Electric Bass Guitar & Chant
Gabriel Moffat - Electric Guitar & Lap Steel Guitar
Molly Ruttan - Vocals & Percussion
Linda Ruttan-Moldawsky - Vocals
Mark Sherkus - Keyboards & Electric Guitar
Jonny Unicorn - Keyboards, Saxophone, Vocals & Chant
Mixed by Gabriel Moffat
Artwork by Linda Ruttan-Moldawsky
Graphic Production by Molly Ruttan

References

Phideaux Xavier albums
2009 albums